Sarachi is a rural locality (a village) in Vereshchaginsky District, Perm Krai, Russia.  The population was 11 as of 2010.

Geography 
Sarachi is located 24 km northeast of Vereshchagino (the district's administrative centre) by road. Kuzminka is the nearest rural locality.

References 

Rural localities in Vereshchaginsky District